Mohamed Zemzemi (born July 3, 1991) is a Paralympian athlete from Tunisia competing mainly in category F51.

Achievements
He competed in the 2012 Summer Paralympics in London, UK. There he won two bronze medals in the men's Discus Throw F51-53 event.

In 2013 IPC Athletics World Championships in Lyon, Mohamed Zemzemi won a silver medal in Men's discus throw F51/52/53 event.

See also
 Tunisia at the 2013 IPC Athletics World Championships
 Tunisia at the 2012 Summer Paralympics
 Tunisia at the Paralympics

References

External links 
 

1991 births
Living people
Tunisian male discus throwers
Paralympic athletes of Tunisia
Paralympic bronze medalists for Tunisia
Athletes (track and field) at the 2012 Summer Paralympics
Medalists at the 2012 Summer Paralympics
Paralympic medalists in athletics (track and field)